is a Japanese actress from Osaka Prefecture. Her debut role was in the film Tenshi ga Kureta Mono, and she was later cast in the film adaptations of Higurashi no Naku Koro ni as Mion Sonozaki. She also played Akira Karasaki for several episodes of K-tai Investigator 7. In 2009, Asuka joined the cast of Kamen Rider W as Wakana Sonozaki.

Filmography

Films

Television

Web Drama

Stage

Radio

Commercial

Music Video

References

External links
Official profile at Agape
Rin Asuka (@rrrrrin_0328) - Twitter
Rin Asuka (@rin_asuka0328) - Instagram

1991 births
Living people
People from Osaka Prefecture
Stardust Promotion artists
21st-century Japanese actresses